River Patrol may refer to:

 River Patrol (film), a 1948 British film directed by Ben R. Hart 
 River Patrol (video game), a 1981 Japanese arcade game